Keith Paul Hightower (born January 14, 1957) is an American businessman who was from 1998 to 2006 the Democratic mayor of Shreveport, Louisiana.

Hightower graduated in 1975 from Captain Shreve High School; one of his classmates was later State Senator Greg Barro, a Shreveport lawyer. Hightower then graduated in 1979 from Louisiana Tech University in Ruston, the seat of Lincoln Parish. He was one of the relatively few graduates in his college class from Shreveport who returned to live and work in their hometown. First, however, Hightower was employed by Acme Brick Co. in Baton Rouge; the firm transferred him to Shreveport. In 1990, Hightower was elected to the first of two terms on the Shreveport City Council from District C. He left the brick company and thereafter made his living in automobile sales.

In the 1998, Hightower unseated Republican Mayor Robert W. "Bo" Williams in the municipal nonpartisan blanket primary. Hightower led with 20,250 votes (42 percent) to Williams' 13,637 (28 percent). Three other candidates, two Democrats and another Republican, divided the remaining 30 percent of the ballots. Williams, who trailed by nearly 7,000 votes, declined to proceed to a general election, and Hightower became mayor-elect without the need for a second round of balloting.

Hightower was reelected with 75 percent of the vote in 2002 over the conservative Republican, Vernon D. Adams. Hightower polled 31,054 votes to Adams' 10,611.

Under the Hightower administration, Shreveport was designated an All America City, Riverview Park was developed, and the Convention Center and the Hilton Convention Hotel were constructed. Independence Stadium was expanded and renovated, and a new Central Fire Station was constructed. City Hall was moved into a downtown "Government Plaza", a space-sharing arrangement with the Caddo Parish Commission and the sheriff's department. There were improvements to the riverfront and expansion of the tourist industry, including new casino hotels. A shopping corridor was developed on Youree Drive, and the Shreveport Port experienced major growth as well. The improvements were funded before Shreveport received a windfall from the Haynesville Shale operation.

In the race to succeed Hightower, voters chose a Republican attorney, Jerry Jones, and a state Representative, Cedric Glover, in the primary election. Jones led the balloting with 39 percent, and Glover trailed with 32 percent, but Glover emerged the ultimate victor, winning 54-46 percent over Jones in the November general election. Democrat Liz Swaine, a former broadcast journalist and Hightower's executive assistant, Republican Vernon Adams, and departing State Senator Max T. Malone were among the nine contenders who were eliminated in the primary.

Hightower had considered seeking the open secretary of state's position in the September 30, 2006 balloting but never filed candidacy papers, and victory went to Tom Schedler. On November 29, 2006, Hightower returned to his old job as vice president of the Holmes Auto Group.

Hightower and his wife have two daughters, both of whom attended the University of Mississippi at Oxford, Mississippi.

In 2014, Hightower declined to enter the open contest for mayor. The incumbent Cedric Glover was term-limited and succeeded by Ollie Tyler.

References

External links
 https://www.ktbs.com/news/bossier-city-expected-to-get-millions-from-leasing-its-mineral/article_0cf6dc91-b2c1-513c-b419-804590d6e185.html

 Keith Hightower Campaign (2002). "About Keith Hightower". Retrieved Jan. 26, 2006.
 
 
 
 

1957 births
Living people
Businesspeople from Louisiana
Captain Shreve High School alumni
Louisiana Tech University alumni
Louisiana city council members
Mayors of Shreveport, Louisiana
Louisiana Democrats